Claudio Mezzadri (born 10 June 1965) is a retired professional tennis player from Switzerland. Mezzadri turned professional in 1983, and won his only ATP singles title four years later in Geneva. He also won four doubles titles in his career. His highest ranking was world No. 26 in singles in November 1987 and No. 23 in doubles in February 1988.

Mezzadri participated in nine Davis Cup ties for Switzerland from 1987 to 1991, posting an 11–4 record in singles and a 3–2 record in doubles.

Career finals

Singles (1–1)

Doubles (4–5)

External links
 
 
 

1965 births
Hopman Cup competitors
Living people
People from Locarno
Swiss male tennis players
Sportspeople from Ticino